The Oklahoma Department of Commerce is a department of the government of Oklahoma under the Oklahoma secretary of commerce. The department is responsible for the supporting local communities, stimulating growth of the existing businesses, attracting new business, and promoting the development and availability of a skilled workforce. The department is the lead agency for economic development in the state. The department is led by and under the control of a director appointed by the governor of Oklahoma, with the approval of the Oklahoma Senate, to serve at the pleasure of the governor.

The current cabinet secretary is Sean Kouplen, who was appointed by Governor Kevin Stitt in January 2019.

The Department of Commerce was established in 1987 during the term of Governor Henry Bellmon.

Mission
To increase the quantity and quality of jobs available in Oklahoma by:

 Supporting communities;
 Supporting the growth of existing businesses and entrepreneurs;
 Attracting new businesses; and
 Promoting the development and availability of a skilled workforce.

Leadership
The department is led by the Secretary of Commerce and the director of the Department of Commerce. Under Governor of Oklahoma Kevin Stitt, Sean Kouplen is serving in the position.

Organization
Cabinet Secretary
Director
Deputy Director
Business Customer Services Division
Business Development Services - responsible for the retention and creation of jobs in existing businesses
International Trade Promotion - responsible for promoting export trade and the attraction of foreign direct investment
Mexico City, Mexico Trade Office
Community Development Division
Community Development Services - responsible for providing technical assistance to and financial investment in local communities
Main Street Center - responsible for providing training and technical assistance for preservation-based commercial district revitalization
National Recruitment Division - responsible for recruiting new business investment
Research and Analysis Division - responsible for providing information and analysis on State's business climate, tax incentives, and business advantages
Deputy Director and General Counsel
Executive Services Division - provides administrative support services to entire Department
Human Resources Division - provides all personnel services for Department
Financial Affairs Division - provides financial services to the Department
Deputy Secretary of Commerce for Workforce Solutions
Workforce Development Division

Staffing
The Commerce Department, with an annual budget of $100 million, is one of the smaller employers of the state. For fiscal year 2018, the department was authorized 92 full-time employees in FY2014.

Budget
The Commerce Department has an annual budget of several hundred million dollars, making it one of the smaller appropriated agencies of the State. For fiscal year 2011, the department's budget consists of 20% in annual appropriations and 80% in federal grants. The department's divisions have the following budgets:

Supporting Agencies
Oklahoma Housing Finance Agency
Oklahoma Department of Labor
Native American Cultural & Educational Authority of Oklahoma
Oklahoma Economic Development Databases
Oklahoma Space Industry Development Authority

References

External links 
 Department of Commerce homepage

Commerce
State departments of commerce of the United States
1987 establishments in Oklahoma